The 2017 season will be the 88th season of competitive baseball in the United Kingdom.

The season will begin on 2 April 2017 and run until early September.

BFF Affiliated Leagues

National Baseball League

The NBL will consist of 30 games spread from 2 April to 27 August, with the National Championship series played in September

Updated through  30 July.

Triple-A

The Triple-A season will consist of 22 games played from 23 April to 20 August, with the playoffs in September.

Updated through 30 July

Double-A

Central Division

Updated 30 July

South Division

Pool A

Updated through 30 July.

Pool B

Updated 30 July

Single-A

Central

South

Non-BFF Affiliated Leagues

South West Baseball League

North Conference

South Conference

Season will consist of ten rounds from 7 May to 6 August.

Baseball Scotland

References

Baseball in the United Kingdom
Baseball
Baseball
British
Baseball competitions in the United Kingdom